George Chip (Lit. Jurgis Čepulionis, August 25, 1888  – November 6, 1960) was a Lithuanian-American boxer who was the World Middleweight Champion from 1913 to 1914 in an era of great middleweights. Chip came to be known as a heavy puncher with an impressive knockout ratio. He was the father of Major general William C. Chip, USMC.

Early life and career
Chip was born on August 25, 1888, in Scranton but was raised in New Castle, Pennsylvania, in what is today the Pittsburgh metropolitan area, where most of his matches occurred.  He was of Lithuanian descent. His manager was Jimmy Dime.

He was active in both baseball and football in his youth, and later worked in the coal mines in Madison, Pennsylvania.  In January 1909, realizing his athletic gifts at the age of twenty, he decided to try boxing on the advice of L. B. Lewis, a mining Superintendent he knew.  He won his first match when Billy Manfredo received a second round disqualification in Greensburgh, Pennsylvania.  The following month he knocked out George Gill and John Chew.  He continued to fight through 1910 with only one recorded loss.

Taking the World Middleweight Title from Frank Klaus

During a title fight on 11 October 1913, Chip surprised the crowd when he knocked out reigning world middleweight champion Frank Klaus with a strong right hook to the jaw near the end of the sixth and final round.  Prior to the knockout, in the first five rounds, Chip never threatened to take the lead.  The fight occurred at the old Pittsburgh City Hall at Market Square . It was the first knockout of Klaus's career. The extra weight Klaus was carrying in his midsection led many reporters to believe he had not trained adequately for the bout, and had underestimated the ability of his opponent.

Frequent bouts with Jack Dillon and "Buck" Crouse

Chip fought the exceptional boxer Jack Dillon over ten times, usually losing to him in the opinions of newspapers.  Dillon was an Indiana-born Hall of Famer who held the light heavyweight championship of the world from 1914 to 1916.

Chip fought Pittsburgh area boxer Albert "Buck" Crouse seven times during his career, mostly in no decision bouts, losing to him only once.

Defending the World Middleweight Title in no decision bouts
On November 25, 1913, after taking the title, Chip faced Tim O'Neil in a ten-round no decision bout in Racine, Wisconsin.  Though he won the bout by newspaper decision, he would have lost the title had he been knocked out by O'Neil.

On December 23, 1913, some sources reported that Chip's rematch with Klaus in Pittsburgh was a middleweight championship, however, as the fight was fought at catchweights, boxing historians do not consider the bout a title match.  After knocking down Klaus twice in the fifth, the referee called the bout, resulting in a Technical Knockoout.  The second win over the former title holder cemented Chip's place as champion.

On January 12, 1914, Chip faced Gus Christie in a ten-round no decision bout in Milwaukee, Wisconsin.  Though he won the bout by newspaper decision, he would have lost the title had he been knocked out by Christie.

On January 14, 1914, Chip faced Tim O'Neil again in a ten-round no decision bout in Milwaukee, Wisconsin.  He won the bout in a second-round TKO, exhibiting his strong punching abilities.

Surrendering the World Middleweight Title in shocking loss to Al McCoy

On April 7, 1914, six months after taking the title, Chip stunningly lost it to young southpaw Al McCoy in a surprise first round knock-out.   McCoy was considered a light hitter with only a 23% knockout rate.  McCoy's manager, Charlie Goldman, wisely advised his boxer to charge for a knockout against Chip from the first bell.  Goldman wisely assumed Chip would box cautiously early in the first round against Al's unorthodox, left handed style.

Taking his manager's advice, McCoy landed a powerful left to Chip's jaw early in the first round, lifting him off the canvas, and achieving a victory that probably shocked the bookmakers.  The knockout occurred just one minute and fifty seconds after the opening bell. The Pittsburgh Press noted that the Broadway Sporting Club in Brooklyn was only "fairly filled" as spectators may have stayed home expecting a loss or poor showing from McCoy. Robert Edgren, summarizing the last few seconds of the fight, wrote "McCoy's left fist started somewhere near his knees. He brought it up with all his strength. His body swung upward with the blow as though he had been swinging at a bag. His fist landed fairly on the point of the crouching champion's unguarded chin."  Though Chip held the title only six months, he is remembered as a boxer who faced most of the serious challengers for the title.

Career after loss of the World Middleweight Title

Bout with Jeff Smith, future Australian World Middleweight Champion
On December 7, 1915, Chip lost to Jeff Smith, future Australian World Middleweight Champion, in a seventh round disqualification at the Hippodrome in Boston.  The New Castle News wrote that Chip was clearly winning the contest when he was disqualified by the referee for a low blow.  Some reporters wrote  the blow to the torso was not below the belt, and believed Chip was close to winning the bout by knockout.

Bouts with Jimmy Clabby
Between November 1914 and May 1915, Chip fought Jimmy Clabby four times. Clabby, an exceptional talent, competed for but never won a world title in his career, though he took the World Middleweight and Light Heavyweight titles of Australia and the Heavyweight Championship of New Zealand.  On November 6, 1914, Chip lost a twenty-round bout with Clabby in Daly City, California, outside San Francisco.  The San Francisco Chronicle reported that Clabby won easily, taking seventeen rounds.  On March 22, 1915, Clabby beat Chip again in the opinion of newspapers, in a six-round no decision bout in Grand Rapids, Michigan.

Winning non-title rematch with Al McCoy
On January 20, 1916, after losing his Middleweight Title, Chip easily won a ten-round no decision rematch with Al McCoy in Brooklyn's Broadway Arena according to the New York Times.  Reportedly, McCoy was badly battered in the bout, and at one point in the third round was down for nine seconds.  Chip had knocked McCoy down for a short count earlier in the round. A knockout would have transferred the title back to Chip from reigning champion McCoy.  According to The Pittsburgh Post, Chip was the aggressor throughout, and McCoy took one of worst beatings in the fight.  But McCoy more importantly managed to last seven rounds after his knockdown without hitting the canvas and retained his title.

Competing for the Australian World Middleweight Championship
On September 30, 1916, Chip fell to a ninth-round knockout from Australian boxer Les Darcy for Australia's World Middleweight Title in Sydney. The Australian fans bet heavily on their national champion, who carried the fight decisively throughout.  He followed on November 6, 1916, with an important fourteenth-round knockout victory over American boxer Art Magirl in Melbourne.

Bouts with Middleweight Champions Harry Greb and Mike Gibbons
Chip fought the great middleweight Harry Greb four times in his career, losing decisively to Greb on November 19, 1917, in a ten-round bout in Cincinnati, Ohio.  On May 22, 1917, Greb beat Chip in an exciting ten round bout before a crowd of 4,000 in Pittsburgh.  In two earlier fights in Pennsylvania, Chip beat Greb according to newspapers on June 26, 1916, but received a draw earlier in a closer fight in Pittsburgh in 1915.

Impressive win over Harry Greb
In their ten-round no decision bout on June 26, 1916, in New Castle, Pennsylvania, local newspapers agreed that Chip had the decisive edge over Greb in an impressive win.  The New Castle Herald gave Chip every round, and the Post gave Greb only three rounds.

Between 1917 and 1919, Chip fought the great middleweight Mike Gibbons three times, on July 4, 1917, January 31, 1919, and June 11, 1919.  Chip lost all three fights in the decision of most newspapers. Gibbons' claim to the World Middleweight Title in 1909 was a strong one, though it is not sanctioned today.  Nonetheless, Gibbons was rated in the top 20 all time Middleweights by statistical boxing site BoxRec and The Ring Magazine.

Bouts with brothers Mike and Tommy Gibbons
In the July 1917 bout between Chip and Gibbons at Wright Field in Youngstown, Ohio, Gibbon's World Middleweight Title was at stake if he lost by knockout. The Washington Post wrote that "Gibbons won all the way".  The Harrisburg Telegraph observed that Gibbons had better boxing science and technique, and though Chip may have had the stronger punches, they did not faze Gibbons who was able to avoid his blows and counterpunch effectively.  In the last three rounds, the crowd of 5,000 witnessed the most exciting exchanges.  In their slow January, 1919 bout in Duluth, Gibbons defeated Chip by a "wide margin" after returning from fifteen months in the Army. In a faster bout before a substantial crowd in Terre Haute, Indiana, on June 11, 1919, Chip landed several strong blows but they never fazed Gibbons who had the edge in their fight according to newspapers.  Chip also fought Gibbons' brother Tommy Gibbons five times from 1917 to 1919 though he never beat him in the opinion of most newspapers.

Retirement from boxing
In a rapid decline from February 1918 to April 1922, Chip won only four of thirty-seven bouts.  After beating Lew Shupp and Frankie McGuire, Chip retired from boxing in the Spring of 1922.

He died on November 6, 1960, at New Castle Hospital in his adopted hometown. Two days earlier, he had sustained a broken neck and two fractured legs after being struck by a car during a walk near his home.

Professional boxing record
All information in this section is derived from BoxRec, unless otherwise stated.

Official Record

All newspaper decisions are officially regarded as “no decision” bouts and are not counted as a win/loss/draw column.

Unofficial record

Record with the inclusion of newspaper decisions to the win/loss/draw column.

Achievements

See also
List of middleweight boxing champions

References

External links

Professional boxing record for George Chip from Cyber Boxing Zone

1888 births
1960 deaths
Boxers from Pennsylvania
Middleweight boxers
World boxing champions
World middleweight boxing champions
People from New Castle, Pennsylvania
Sportspeople from Scranton, Pennsylvania
American people of Lithuanian descent
American male boxers